Erythranthe latidens, synonym Mimulus latidens, is a species of monkeyflower known by the common name broadtooth monkeyflower.

It is native to the valleys and coastal mountains of Northern through Southern California and of Baja California state in Mexico. It grows in seasonally moist areas, such as vernal pools. It is also found in Oregon.

Description
Erythranthe latidens is an annual herb producing a thin, branching stem reaching a maximum height near 27 centimeters. The leaves are lance-shaped to oval, with some located in a basal rosette and smaller ones paired along the stem.

The tubular base of each flower is encapsulated in a ribbed calyx of sepals which swells as the fruit matures. The flower is up to a centimeter long, just a few millimeters wide at the mouth, and pink, white, or occasionally yellow in color.

References

External links
Jepson Manual Treatment of Mimulus latidens
USDA Plants Profile
Mimulus latidens— UC Photos gallery

latidens
Flora of California
Flora of Baja California
Flora of Oregon
Natural history of the California chaparral and woodlands
Natural history of the California Coast Ranges
Natural history of the Central Valley (California)
Natural history of the San Francisco Bay Area
Flora without expected TNC conservation status